Susan Cabot (born Harriet Pearl Shapiro; July 9, 1927 – December 10, 1986) was an American film, stage, and television actress. She rose to prominence for her roles in a variety of Western films, including Tomahawk (1951), The Duel at Silver Creek (1952), and Gunsmoke (1953).

After severing her contract with Universal Pictures in the mid-1950s, Cabot returned to performing in theater in New York. She subsequently returned to Hollywood in the later part of the decade, and appeared in a series of films by director Roger Corman, such as Sorority Girl (1957), War of the Satellites, and Machine-Gun Kelly (both 1958). She made her final film appearance in Corman's horror feature, The Wasp Woman (1959).

Cabot spent the following two decades largely in seclusion, though she did appear in off-Broadway theatre in the early 1960s, and made a 1970 television appearance on the series Bracken's World. By the 1980s, Cabot was suffering from severe mental illness, including depression, suicidal thoughts, and irrational phobias.

On December 10, 1986, Cabot's only child, 22-year-old Timothy Roman, bludgeoned her to death in their Los Angeles home with a weightlifting bar after Cabot purportedly awoke in a panicked state and attacked him. Roman, who had dwarfism and suffered pituitary gland problems, pleaded guilty to involuntary manslaughter, and was sentenced to three years' probation for his matricide.

Biography

1927–1946: Early life
Cabot was born Harriet Pearl Shapiro on July 9, 1927, to a Jewish family in Boston, Massachusetts. She led an early life filled with turmoil; after her father abandoned their family, Cabot's mother Elizabeth was institutionalized, leaving Cabot orphaned. She was subsequently raised in eight different foster homes, spending the majority of her early life in the New York City borough of the Bronx. It was posthumously revealed that, while in foster care, Cabot suffered emotional and sexual abuse, which triggered intense post-traumatic stress disorder.

Cabot attended high school in Manhattan, and found employment as an illustrator of children's books. She supplemented her income by working as a singer, performing at the Village Barn club in Manhattan. She married her first husband, the artist Martin Sacker, on July 30, 1944, in Washington, DC, while still a minor. Sacker was a childhood friend, and the marriage presented Cabot with an opportunity to leave foster care.

1947–1959: Acting career
Cabot made her film debut in Twentieth Century Fox's film noir Kiss of Death (1947), which was filmed in New York, playing a bit part as a restaurant patron. She was subsequently spotted performing at the Village Barn by a talent scout for Columbia Pictures, who cast her in On the Isle of Samoa (1950). This role led to further Hollywood roles, with Cabot signing a contract with Universal Pictures. Her first film with the studio was the 1951 Western Tomahawk. The same year, Cabot divorced her husband, Sacker, and was subsequently romantically linked with King Hussein of Jordan for several years.

Based on her performances in the On the Isle of Samoa and Tomahawk, Cabot appeared as a lead in a series of roles in similar Western and Arabian-themed films, such as The Battle at Apache Pass and The Duel at Silver Creek, and Son of Ali Baba (all 1952). In 1953, she starred in a further two Westerns: Gunsmoke and Ride Clear of Diablo.

Dissatisfied with her film offers, Cabot asked to be released from her contract in 1954. She returned to New York, and resumed her stage career with a role in a Leonard Kantor-directed, Washington DC-based production of Harold Robbins' A Stone for Danny Fisher. Cabot studied acting with Sanford Meisner in New York, and continued to pursue a stage career, appearing in a short-lived run of the musical Shangri-La in Boston in 1959.

Cabot returned to Los Angeles and resumed a film career in the latter part of the 1950s, appearing in a series of films for Roger Corman: Carnival Rock, Sorority Girl, The Viking Women and the Sea Serpent (all 1957), War of the Satellites, and Machine-Gun Kelly (both 1958). The same year, she had a lead role in the Western Fort Massacre, opposite Joel McCrea. Cabot's final film role was in Corman's horror film The Wasp Woman (1959). Speaking on her work with Corman, Cabot recalled it as "Totally mad. It was like a European movie," though she stated that Corman was "some kind of maverick... he's very bright and fast-thinking."

1960–1986: Seclusion and later life
Cabot had a seven-year affair with King Hussein of Jordan and their only child was born out of wedlock in 1964. She received $1500 in monthly support from Hussein. In 1968, she married her second husband Michael Roman with whom she raised her son, Timothy Scott Roman, before again divorcing in 1983.

In the last years of her life, Cabot suffered from depression and suicidal thoughts, and was prey to a wide range of irrational, powerful fears. She was under a licensed psychologist's care, but the psychologist found her so troubled and ill that the sessions became "emotionally draining." Cabot became increasingly unable to care for herself; the interior of her home was littered with years of trash, and spoiled food lay everywhere. In late 1986, Cabot's mental health deteriorated significantly. Despite the squalor of the home's interior, Cabot still maintained an "adequate" income despite having retired from acting, largely due to real estate investments and her fascination with vintage cars, which she regularly acquired, restored, and resold.

Death
On December 10, 1986, Cabot's 22-year-old son, Timothy Scott Roman, beat her to death in her home in the Encino neighborhood of Los Angeles, with a weightlifting bar. He was charged with second-degree murder.

At trial, Roman testified that his mother had awakened him while screaming, not recognizing him, and calling for her mother, Elizabeth. When he attempted to call emergency services, she attacked him with a barbell bar and a scalpel. Roman seized the bar from her and beat her repeatedly on the head.

He then hid the bar and scalpel, and told police that a man in a ninja mask had killed his mother (believing no one would believe his story about her mental illness). Roman's defense attorneys claimed their client's aggressive reaction to his mother's attack was due to the drugs he took to counteract his dwarfism and pituitary gland problems as part of treatments for his Creutzfeldt-Jakob disease.

At the close of the trial, prosecutors changed the charge to involuntary manslaughter, as no evidence had been presented at trial to support premeditation (which was required for a murder conviction). Superior Court Judge Darlene E. Schempp deliberated 10 minutes, and then convicted Roman of involuntary manslaughter. Roman, who had already spent  years in jail, was sentenced to three years' probation on November 28, 1989.

Roman died of complications from CJD on January 22, 2003, aged 38.

Filmography

Film

Television

Stage credits

References

Sources

External links

Susan Cabot —from the series Mysteries & Scandals, Season 3 Episode 23 (YouTube video)

Image of Susan Cabot, Sal Mineo and Christine Carere at the motion picture premiere of "Diary of Anne Frank" in Los Angeles, California, 1959.  Los Angeles Times Photographic Archive (Collection 1429). UCLA Library Special Collections, Charles E. Young Research Library, University of California, Los Angeles.

1927 births
1986 deaths
1986 murders in the United States
20th-century American actresses
Actresses from Boston
American film actresses
American people of Russian-Jewish descent
American stage actresses
American television actresses
Deaths by beating in the United States
Jewish American actresses
Matricides
Murdered American Jews
People from the Bronx
People murdered in California
Western (genre) film actresses
20th-century American Jews